Gmina Ujazd may refer to either of the following administrative districts in Poland:
Gmina Ujazd, Opole Voivodeship
Gmina Ujazd, Łódź Voivodeship